Ripley is a town in the Amber Valley borough of Derbyshire, England.

History
Little information remains as to when Ripley was founded, but it appears in the 1086 Domesday Book, when it was held by a man called Levenot.

In 1251 Henry III granted a charter for "one market one day a week, on Wednesday, at [the] manor of Ryppeleg: and one fair each year lasting three days, on the Vigil Day and Morrow of St Helen". Ripley Fair antedates Nottingham Goose Fair. The market day was later altered to Saturdays, with an extra market on Fridays.

Medieval Ripley was just a few stone cottages and farms around a village green, with a few dwellings further afield. Corn was ground at a mill owned by the Abbot of Darley. In 1291, Ripley had "two water-mills with fish ponds".

The Ripley area has been industrialised since the late 18th century. One of the earliest firms to take advantage of local mineral resources was the Butterley Company. It was formed in 1790 by Benjamin Outram and Francis Beresford. Jessop and Wright joined as partners in 1791. Benjamin Outram and Jessop were pioneering engineers best known for their input into the rail industry and their engineering of the Cromford Canal. Outram developed the L-shaped flange rail and Jessop engineered the cast iron fish belly rail. The Little Eaton Gangway project was one of the engineering feats they completed. The engineering part of the company closed and the site of the Butterley Company was demolished in 2010. The company was latterly in three parts, Butterley Engineering, Butterley Brick and Butterley Aggregates (all separate companies). Over the last 200 years these have dealt with steelworks, coal mining, quarrying, railway, foundry and brickworks. One of the best-known examples of the company's work is the arched roof of St Pancras railway station in London, recently restored as an international terminal. Recent major Butterley achievements were the design and construction of the Falkirk Wheel, a canal boat-lift funded by the Millennium Commission and the Spinnaker Tower seen in Portsmouth Harbour as the focus of its regeneration.

Ripley was also a mining community, with collieries owned by the Butterley Company until the Coal Nationalisation Act of 1947. These included Ripley colliery (1863–1948), Britain colliery (1918–1946), Ormonde 1908–1970, and other pits at Upper and Lower Hartshay, Whiteley, Waingroves, Bailey Brook, Exhibition, Loscoe, New Langley and Denby Hall.

Governance

What is now Ripley Town Hall on the north side of the Market Place was erected in 1880 as a market hall. The architect was George Eyre of Codnor. It occupied the site of a much older dwelling known as The White House. The Market Hall was originally open on the ground floor. In 1907, it was converted into a Town Hall by the Urban District Council. In the 1990s, the building was much extended to the west and remodelled by Amber Valley Borough Council to form its headquarters. In 2012, the Council proposed to sell off some of the buildings under a rationalization scheme.

Demography
According to research into names in Britain in 2006, Ripley has the highest proportion of people of ethnic English origin. Of Ripley's inhabitants, 88.5 per cent have an English ethnic background.

Education

Primary schools
Ripley Junior School, Poplar Avenue, DE5 3PN
St Johns C of E Primary School, Dannah Street, Ripley
Lons Infant School, Tavistock Avenue, Ripley
Waingroves Primary School, Waingroves Road, Ripley
Codnor Community Primary School, Whitegates

Secondary schools
The Ripley Academy, Peasehill Road, Ripley 
Swanwick Hall School, Swanwick Hill, Swanwick (2 miles north on B6179 road)
John Flamsteed School, Derby Road, Denby (2.5 miles south on B6179)

Pre-schools
Ripley Nursery School, Sandham Lane
Clowns Day Nursery, Cromford Road
Clowns Day Nursery, Butterley Park, A610
Alphabet Childminders, Ripley.

Religion
The Methodist Church in Wood Street is reputed to be the oldest church in the town that is still active. At the peak of the movement there were five Methodist churches in Ripley, but the congregations combined over the years. The church was rebuilt on the same site and reopened in November 2009. See History of Methodism in Ripley Derbyshire

An outcome of the nearby Pentridge (or Pentrich) Rising of 1817 was for the Vicar of Pentrich Church to call for an Anglican church to be built in Ripley as soon as possible. All Saints' Church, Ripley was erected in 1821 by the Butterley Company.

Other places of worship include the Salvation Army hall in Heath Road, which was opened in 1911, the Springs of the Living Water housed in the former St John's Church in Derby Road, the Spiritual Church in Argyll Road, and Marehay Methodist Chapel in Warmwells Lane, Marehay.

Transport
Running under the premises of the Butterley Company is the  Butterley Tunnel on the Cromford Canal. The central section of the canal is disused, but a charitable fund has been formed to reopen it.

Ripley is the site of Midland Railway – Butterley (formerly the Midland Railway Centre), a trust dedicated to preserving railway locomotives, rolling stock and other items related to the Midland Railway.

Ripley was once served by Ripley railway station on the Midland Railway Ripley Branch. It was the northern terminus of the Nottinghamshire and Derbyshire Tramways Company and later of the Nottinghamshire and Derbyshire trolleybus system.

Media
Ripley's local radio station, Amber Sound FM, is based in the Unicorn Business Park off Wellington Street. The station broadcasts on 107.2FM in the Amber Valley and online.

Parks and natural features
Butterley Reservoir, at the bottom of Butterley Hill in the north of the town, has pairs of great crested grebe, coot, moorhens and other birds to watch, and platforms for anglers to use. There is a footpath that takes in the scenery, with the Midland Railway Trust in the background.

Wildlife and a small woodland area can be enjoyed at Carr Wood, signposted from halfway down Butterley Hill.

At the bottom of Moseley Street, next to the Red Lion pub in Ripley Town Centre, is a recreation area named after Sir Barnes Wallis, which offers views over to Crich Stand, the Sherwood Foresters Memorial. Crich Stand was built by Francis Hurt in 1778 and in 1922 dedicated to the fallen of the Sherwood Foresters Regiment (colloquially known as the Woofers) in World War I. It is now the memorial for those in the Regiment who died in all conflicts.

The Pit Top is an open area with some seating and a white arch sculpture. The grassed area is the site of the original Ripley Colliery, owned by Butterley Company and worked from 1863 until 1948.

Crossley Park is a few acres of grassed land opened in 1935. It is surrounded by shrubs and trees on a tract given to the town by James Crossley in 1901. It has a children's play area with a paddling pool, a paved perimeter walk, and a bandstand used as such occasionally on late Sunday afternoons in the summer.

Twin towns
Ripley is twinned with the French towns of Château-Renault and Lons-le-Saunier.

Community and facilities
The headquarters of Derbyshire Constabulary is on the outskirts of Ripley at Butterley Hall.

Ripley has a community hospital with a minor accident and emergency department that opened on 7 September 1912. The hospital was built after the death of a miner injured at Pentrich Colliery, who did not survive the road journey to Derby in time for treatment. The Ripley Hospital League of Friends has been an active fund-raising group for the hospital throughout its history.

Ripley has a Scout group founded in 1914. For younger children it has two Beaver colonies and a Cub pack.

Notable residents
Gavin Butt (born 1967), an art historian based at Goldsmiths, University of London, was born in Ripley.
Arthur Octavius Edwards (1876–1960), a civil engineer who built and managed the Grosvenor House Hotel in London, was born in Ripley.
Agnes Elizabeth Slack, a leading temperance campaigner, was born here in 1858.
John Bamford Slack (1857–1909), Liberal MP and prominent Methodist, was born in Ripley.
Andy Sneap (born 1969), a heavy metal record producer and thrash metal musician, whose company Backstage Productions is based in the town
Bombardier Charles Stone (1889–1952), awarded the VC, was born in Ripley.
Sir James Outram, 1st Baronet (1803–1863), born in Ripley, fought in the Indian Rebellion of 1857 and became known as the "Bayard of India". He was buried in Westminster Abbey.
Sir Barnes Wallis (1887–1979), inventor of the "bouncing bomb", was born in Ripley. He has a town park named after him, and a pub, The Sir Barnes Wallis, until it was demolished in 2021. His house of birth bears a blue plaque. His father was a doctor at The Elms in Derby Road.

Arms

See also
Listed buildings in Ripley, Derbyshire

References

External links

Ripley Town Council

Geography of Amber Valley
Towns in Derbyshire